Banana da Terra (English: Banana of the Land) is a 1939 Brazilian musical film directed by Ruy Costa and written by Braguinha and Mário Lago. The film stars Carmen Miranda, Dircinha Batista and Aloysio de Oliveira. It was Miranda's last film in Brazil, before she moved to Hollywood.

Plot 
In Banana da Terra, the actor Oscarito plays a man in charge of a publicity campaign for bananas who decides to kidnap the queen of Bananolândia, played by Dircinha Batista. She is taken to Rio and promptly falls in love with a character played by Aloísio de Oliveira, a member of Carmen Miranda's backing group, the Bando da Lua. The action unfolds in the glamorous realm of Rio's radio station and casinos, thus providing the perfect pretext for inclusion of a variety of musical numbers.

Production 
In 1939, Sonofilmes released the musical comedy Banana da Terra, which, like many of its musical predecessors, belonged to the tradition of carnival films that included hit songs and were released just before the annual celebrations. According to the Jornal do Brasil newspaper, Banana da Terra was to premiere on 10 February at the MGM-owned cinemas in Rio and São Paulo, the Pedro II cinema in Petrópolis, in the state of Rio de Janeiro, and the Guarani cinema in Salvador, Bahia, as well as in Recife, Porto Alegre and Ribeirão Preto. Negotiations were also underway to show the film in the state capitals of Curitiba and Belo Horizonte. Thanks to the links between Alberto Byington Jr, Wallace Downey's associate, and Hollywood, this Sonofilmes production was distributed by MGM in Brazil, and consequently premiered in the luxurious Metro Passeio in Rio.

Banana da Terra proved to be a great commercial success and to markedly influence the chanchada tradition, not least by combining self-deprecating humour with a tongue-in-cheek critique of Hollywood clichés.

The plot of the movie, first and foremost a construct to link together the various musical numbers, revolves around the imaginary Pacific island of Bananolândia, an allegorical tropical paradise, which was faced with the problem of a surplus of bananas. In this self-parodic comedy, Brazil adopts the reflected identity of the exotic island of plenty.

These include "A Jardineira" by Benedito Lacerda and Humberto Porto, sung by Orlando Silva, which proved to be the carnival smash of the 1939 celebrations, and "Sei que é covardia" by Ataúflo Alves and Claudionor Cruz. Banana da Terra is best remembered for Carmen Miranda's rendition of the Dorival Caymmi song "O que é que a baiana tem?", dresses in the "baiana" costume, in keeping with the song's lyrics. It is said that the composer went to Miranda's house where he taught her performance. But it was Miranda who made the look her own and used it to launch her international career as the embodiment of a pan-Latin American identity. Banana da Terra was to be Miranda's last Brazilian film; it was when performing its hit song "O que é que a baiana tem?" at Rio's Urca casino that she was "discovered" by the show business impresario Lee Shubert and taken to Broadway, and subsequently to Hollywood.

Cast 

 Carmen Miranda
 Dircinha Batista
 Oscarito	
 Aloísio de Oliveira
 Aurora Miranda		
 Lauro Borges			
 Jorge Murad		
 Neide Martins	
 Mario Silva			
 Paulo Neto	
 Almirante		
 Alvarenga		
 Fernando Alvarez		
 Ivo Astolphi		
 Castro Barbosa	
 Linda Batista		
 Emilinha Borba	
 Oswaldo de Moraes Eboli		
 Carlos Galhardo	
 Hélio Jordão	
 Barbosa Júnior		
 César Ladeira		
 Virgínia Lane	
 Afonso Osório	
 Stênio Osório	
 Ranchinho		
 Linda Rodrigues	
 Orlando Silva	
 Romeu Silva	
 Napoleão Tavares

Musical numbers 
 O Que é Que a Baiana Tem? ... Performed by Carmen Miranda
 Pirulito ... Performed by Carmen Miranda and Almirante
 Menina do Regimento ... Performed by Aurora Miranda
 A Tirolesa ... Performed by Dircinha Batista
 Eu Vou Pra Farra ... Performed by Bando da Lua
 Não Sei Por Quê ... Performed by Bando da Lua
 Sei Que É Covardia, Mas ... Performed by Carlos Galhardo
 Sem Banana ... Performed by Carlos Galhardo
 Mares da China ... Performed by Carlos Galhardo
 Amei Demais ... Performed by Castro Barbosa
 A Jardineira ... Performed by Orlando Silva

References

External links
 

1939 musical comedy films
1939 films
Brazilian musical comedy films
1930s Portuguese-language films
Lost Brazilian films
Brazilian black-and-white films